Männer was a German lifestyle magazine for lesbian, gay, bisexual, and transgender people, published by the German company Bruno Gmünder Verlag. Between 1989 and 2007, the magazine was published as Männer aktuell.

History
The magazine was established in 1987. Notable writers (present and past) are Kevin Clarke, Peter Rehberg, Frank Herrmann, Jürgen Bienieck, Thilo Keller. The last issue of Männer appeared in March 2017.

From 2011 to 2013, its editor was musicologist Kevin Clarke. From 2013 to 2015, it was the theologian David Berger. At the end of 2014, the AIDS association Aids-Hilfe denounced Berger's discriminatory remarks in the pages of Männer.

References

External links
 Männer official site 
 Bruno Gmünder Verlag

1987 establishments in West Germany
2017 disestablishments in Germany
Defunct magazines published in Germany
German-language magazines
LGBT-related magazines published in Germany
Magazines established in 1987
Magazines disestablished in 2017
Magazines published in Berlin
Monthly magazines published in Germany
Cultural magazines published in Germany